Aleksandr Ivanovich Ivanov (April 14, 1928 – March 29, 1997) was a  Soviet football player.

International career
Ivanov made his debut for USSR on June 8, 1958, in a 1958 FIFA World Cup game against England, scoring a goal on his debut.

External links
  Profile

1928 births
1997 deaths
Soviet footballers
Soviet Union international footballers
Soviet Top League players
FC Zenit Saint Petersburg players
1958 FIFA World Cup players
Russian footballers
Footballers from Saint Petersburg
Association football forwards